The 2012 Critérium du Dauphiné was the sixty-fourth running of the Critérium du Dauphiné cycling stage race; a race rated as a World Tour event on the UCI calendar, the highest classification such an event can have. The race consisted of eight stages, beginning with a prologue in Grenoble on 3 June, and concluded in Châtel on 10 June. The race was organised by the Amaury Sport Organisation, the same group that organises the Tour de France. It was viewed as a great preparation for July's Tour de France, hence why a majority of the contenders for the general classification of the major tour participated in the Dauphiné. It featured mountainous stages as well as an individual time trial quite similar in length to those that awaited the riders in the Tour.

The race was won for the second successive year by  rider Bradley Wiggins, who claimed the leader's yellow and blue jersey after the first stage, extending his race-leading advantage after winning the fourth stage individual time trial, and ultimately maintained that advantage. Wiggins became only the third rider to win the Dauphiné and Paris–Nice – a race that Wiggins had won in March – in the same year after Jacques Anquetil (1963 and 1965) and Eddy Merckx (1971) had previously done so.

Wiggins' winning margin over his team-mate and runner-up Michael Rogers was one minute and seventeen seconds, and 's Cadel Evans completed the podium, nine seconds down on Rogers. In the race's other classifications,  rider Cayetano Sarmiento won the King of the Mountains classification, Evans won the green jersey for the points classification, 's Wilco Kelderman won the young rider classification, with  finishing at the head of the teams classification by over thirteen minutes, after placing four riders inside the final overall top ten placings.

Participating teams
As the Critérium du Dauphiné was a UCI World Tour event, all eighteen UCI ProTeams were invited automatically and obligated to send a squad. Four other squads were given wildcard places into the race, and as such, formed the event's 22-team peloton. All twenty-two squads that competed in the Dauphiné contested the Tour de France later in the year.

The twenty-two teams that competed in the race were:

Schedule
The route for the race was announced on 27 March 2012.

Stages

Prologue
3 June 2012 — Grenoble, individual time trial (ITT)

The Dauphiné began with its traditional short individual time trial stage, with a near-flat course around the streets of Grenoble; the city was hosting the prologue of the race for the fourth time in fifteen years following prior starts in 1997, 2000 and 2007, the last of which was won by the 2011 race winner Bradley Wiggins, then riding for the  team. With rain expected to disrupt the stage, as it had done so in the 2011 prologue, teams decided to spread their time trial specialists across the field in order to maximise their potential of winning the stage. For the first rider to depart the start in Grenoble, 's Lieuwe Westra, weather conditions were dry. Westra ultimately recorded a time of 6' 46" for the stage, which was good enough for a top-12 stage placing after all 175 riders had taken to the course. Westra's time was beaten shortly afterwards by  rider Carlos Barredo, who went four seconds quicker around the course,  in length.

Barredo held the top spot for around quarter of an hour, as his time was marginally beaten by Andriy Hryvko, a four-time Ukrainian champion in the discipline, riding for the  team. Durbridge set a time of 6' 38", in the favourable conditions; he held on to his spot throughout the expected changeable weather that was a factor in the remainder of the running order. Following a rain shower that effected the racing during the middle portion of the stage, the later riders to take to the course did have dry roads to contend with but the wind had picked up and made conditions more difficult than what the earlier riders had for their passages through the parcours. Durbridge's time remained untroubled to the end, despite the best attempts of defending champion Wiggins, who finished just 1.35 seconds in arrears in second place, having started last of the 175 competitors. Thus, Durbridge took his first stage victory at World Tour level, which gave him a clean sweep of the jerseys post-stage, for holding the lead of the overall, points and young rider classifications. Other overall contenders Tejay van Garderen, 's Tony Martin, Jérôme Coppel, as well as van Garderen's team-mate Cadel Evans and 2010 winner Janez Brajkovič all lost time in comparison to Wiggins; Martin placed best in fifth position, although Evans also made the top ten, in ninth place.

Stage 1
4 June 2012 — Seyssins to Saint-Vallier, 

With no fewer than six categorised climbs during the  parcours, the first mass-start stage was not ideally suited towards the sprinters, but was favourable towards puncheurs, as the final of the six climbs – the third-category Côte de la Sizeranne – came just  from the stage's finish in Saint-Vallier. Around the same point, a crash involving Pierrick Fédrigo and Samuel Sánchez brought both riders down. Neither rider returned to the main group, as Fédrigo lost over six minutes and Sánchez almost four times that; losing almost 24 minutes, after reports that he had been suffering with broken ribs. He was taken to hospital after the stage, where he was diagnosed with bruised ribs.

The teams of several of the general classification contenders were prevalent on the front of the peloton as they set about reducing the advantage that the breakaway group of six riders were holding over them. The gap had been reduced to around the three-minute mark with  left of the stage to cover. Another big crash happened some  later with 's Simon Gerrans,  rider Pim Ligthart and Dan Martin of  among those to hit the tarmac.  moved forward, and pulled the gap under two minutes and caused the breakaway to splinter through pressure. Bernaudeau – who had figured at each of the mountain passes to the point – and Doi failed to stay with their companions as they approached the day's final climb, the Côte de la Sizeranne. Tjallingii was also dropped by the remaining members of the breakaway, while in the main field, Alexander Vinokourov and Andy Schleck of  – who had been criticised by team manager Johan Bruyneel for his poor opening half to the season – were both struggling off the back of the group. Both riders lost over three minutes by the stage end.

As the lead group approached the top of the Côte de la Sizeranne, Irizar attacked from the group of the remaining three breakaway riders, while Vanmarcke and Edet were joined by  rider Pierre Rolland, who had escaped the confines of the main group itself. Another three-rider move went forwards from the peloton as Rolland's team-mate Cyril Gautier, 's Luis León Sánchez and  rider Philippe Gilbert got clear by several seconds. As Irizar was caught, Jérôme Coppel of  counter-attacked, and was eventually joined by Cadel Evans – a team-mate of Gilbert at  – and 's Andrey Kashechkin, who finished third in the race in 2007.

Stage 2
5 June 2012 — Lamastre to Saint-Félicien, 

Just like the previous day's stage, the second stage of the race also comprised six categorised climbs, packed into the  route through the Ardèche region, with the highest point coming at the summit of the second-category Col de Montivernoux.

Five riders tried to do so, but only one was able to stay in between the breakaway and the peloton.

's Anthony Roux was the rider in question, and he set off after the quartet up front, and was able to reach them with around  remaining of the stage. However, the peloton was not far behind, and the breakaway did not last much longer after that. With the field back together, several riders attempted solo moves off the front of the peloton, including Kadri's team-mate Mikaël Cherel, but all were unsuccessful. The group remained together into the climb towards the finish;  and  headed the group, protecting their main riders Nibali and Cadel Evans from any potential trouble. World time trial champion Tony Martin tried to get clear within the final kilometre for  but could not sustain a gap over everyone else, and  rider Daniel Moreno timed his sprint perfectly, to take his third win of the season, ahead of French pair Julien Simon and 's Tony Gallopin. Wiggins finished ninth to maintain his one-second overall lead over Evans, who was seventh.

Stage 3
6 June 2012 — Givors to La Clayette, 

With a lengthy individual time trial and three mountainous stages left during the itinerary, the third stage was billed as the sprinters' one remaining chance at a stage victory at the Dauphiné. As such, the parcours of the stage suited them; although there were three categorised climbs during the stage – a third-category climb and two fourth-category passes – they were all within the first half of the stage. Behind the lead pair, 's Giovanni Bernaudeau was the first rider from the peloton to cross the fourth-category climbs, and regained the lead of the mountains classification from  rider Blel Kadri.

 and  looked to set the tempo on the front of the peloton, in the hopes of getting their respective sprinters John Degenkolb and Nacer Bouhanni towards the front if a sprint finish materialised. It was those two teams who gradually brought back Maté and Martínez for the majority of the parcours, but as the race drew nearer La Clayette, more teams put men into the relay and the breakaway was ended inside the final .  held their riders on the front of the peloton in the closing stages, with Sylvain Chavanel, seventh overall, being protected by his team-mates before setting the pace at times. Degenkolb's chances for the stage ended with around  remaining due to a puncture.

 looked to get Tony Gallopin in position for the sprint, while behind, Ricardo Garcia clipped the barriers, and fell back into the path of the sprint causing the majority of the field to be hampered; all riders that were impacted by the crash were eventually given the same time. Up front, Edvald Boasson Hagen launched his sprint off the wheel of Gerald Ciolek, and won the stage by a bike length from Ciolek with 's Borut Božič completing the podium. Due to the crash in the closing metres and the resultant nullification of any time gaps, Boasson Hagen's team-mate Bradley Wiggins maintained his one-second lead in the general classification over Cadel Evans, despite his earlier reservations of holding the lead into the time trial due to the skinsuit type provided by the race organisation compared to that of his team. Evans also lost the lead of the points classification to Gallopin, who achieved his third consecutive top-ten finish at the line; adding the points jersey to the young rider jersey that he had already achieved, after Boasson Hagen was dropped the previous day.

Stage 4
7 June 2012 — Villié-Morgon to Bourg-en-Bresse, individual time trial (ITT)

Unlike the third stage time trial in 2011, in which the course used in Grenoble largely set the route for the penultimate-day time trial in the Tour de France a month later, the time trial in the 2012 event was held on an independent course, running from west-to-east between Villié-Morgon and Bourg-en-Bresse, with an undulating parcours that only amounted to a  difference in altitude from start to finish. As was customary of time trial stages, the riders set off in reverse order from where they were ranked in the general classification at the end of the previous stage.

Meyer recorded a time of one hour, seven minutes and fifty seconds as he was first to reach the line; his time held for around a quarter of an hour, as no rider could get within twenty seconds of his time, until his team-mate Luke Durbridge, the prologue winner and incumbent under-23 world time trial champion crossed the finish line in a time of one hour, four minutes and forty-nine seconds, just over three minutes quicker than Meyer. Durbridge's time held top spot for over two hours, as the majority of the field failed to match his time for the  course. It was not until Wilco Kelderman of the  team – starting 143rd as opposed to Durbridge starting 19th – had set quicker times at each of the intermediate timing points that Durbridge's time came under threat from another rider, and Kelderman ultimately beat Durbridge's time by twelve seconds, despite almost overshooting the final corner, narrowly avoiding the barriers on the outside of the corner. At the end of the stage, Kelderman stated that his performance came as "a surprise", taking the lead of the young rider classification from Tony Gallopin in the process.

The first of four  riders to start within the final twenty-five riders, Chris Froome got within eight seconds of Kelderman's time, but it was not until another of the team's riders, Michael Rogers, that the lead changed hands. Although he trailed at the first intermediate point, Rogers overhauled the time of Kelderman at the finish by fourteen seconds; he held the lead into the final five starters, where it was then taken by the world time trial champion Tony Martin, riding for the  team. Martin bettered the time of Rogers by 37 seconds, but it was not to last as Wiggins was cementing his overall lead. Such was Wiggins' performance, which he later deemed "satisfying", that he was almost catching Cadel Evans on the road, despite Evans starting two minutes before Wiggins; Evans ultimately finished the stage in eighth position, 1' 43" down on Wiggins' time.  rider Andy Schleck, another of the overall contenders for the Tour de France along with Evans and Wiggins, lost over ten minutes to Wiggins on the stage after a crash and a puncture.

Stage 5
8 June 2012 — Saint-Trivier-sur-Moignans to Rumilly, 

The first of three mountainous stages to conclude the Dauphiné, the fifth stage of the race was seen as a precursor to the tenth stage of July's Tour de France, with the majority of the day's route making up the parcours of that stage to be held on 11 July. Mini-attacks set the course of the early running of the stage, which was carried out a quick pace, with the peloton covering  in the first hour of racing. After  rider Blel Kadri escaped out of the peloton to take the honours at the first summit of the day, the Côte de Corlier, it was not until the uncategorised Col de la Berche several kilometres later that a group of riders managed to get clear.

A total of ten riders went clear, and quickly gathered a five-minute lead over the rest of the field. At the foot of Le Grand Colombier, another seven riders formed a chase group on the road ahead of the peloton, which was later reduced to just Christophe Kern and Brice Feillu, after Kern had upped the pace in the group. At this point, Kern's team-mate Kévin Reza was dropped from the lead group, and the peloton itself had been slimmed to around fifty riders, with Sylvain Chavanel and David Millar – both in the top ten of the general classification overnight – along with 's Alexander Vinokourov among those that did not feature within the peloton. On the descent from the climb, a group of  riders including Cadel Evans, George Hincapie and Tejay van Garderen broke out from the peloton, in the hope of pulling Evans nearer the overall lead of 's Bradley Wiggins, following his time loss the previous day in the individual time trial.

Having caught Kern and Feillu on the road, the group lost ground to the peloton and with Wiggins later joining up with the group, Evans' efforts were in vain; with the group now back together as a whole, their efforts went back to the original break. The gap peaked out at around the 30-second mark and with nobody looking to help Sánchez with the pace-making in the group, they sat up and allowed to be reabsorbed into the peloton. The peloton crossed the line around one minute down on Vichot, with Wiggins maintaining his 38-second overall lead as he was part of that group.

Stage 6
9 June 2012 — Saint-Alban-Leysse to Morzine, 

The queen stage of the 2012 Dauphiné, the penultimate stage consisted of six categorised climbs during its  parcours, the first of which coming after only  with the first-category Col de Plainpalais. After a pair of third-category passes, the field tackled another first-category climb, the Col de la Colombière coming with  remaining of the stage.

Sarmiento took out maximum points at each of the first two climbs, and thus extended his points advantage that he held over Kadri. With 's Tiago Machado being the best-placed rider of the group at almost six minutes down on overall leader Bradley Wiggins, Wiggins' team-mates were leading the peloton around four minutes down on the lead group.  rider Andriy Hryvko, who had been in the top three earlier in the race, then joined the group after attacking out the front of the peloton. 's Brice Feillu accelerated out of the lead group on the Côte de Châtillon, and soon picked up a gap of over a minute ahead of his former breakaway companions, while the peloton had fallen a little further away from Feillu, as they were almost four-and-a-half minutes behind on the climb.

The group was brought back on the Col de Joux Plane, with only Feillu remaining off the front, almost 90 seconds clear. Nairo Quintana of the  then attacked out of a diminishing favourites group, later followed by 's Cadel Evans. Quintana was too far ahead for Evans to catch him back, and eventually achieved his first World Tour victory by sixteen seconds ahead of Evans, with 's Daniel Moreno leading a group of eight riders, including Wiggins – and team-mates Michael Rogers and Chris Froome – as well as Van Den Broeck, across the line eight seconds later. With 's Tony Martin being dropped on the stage, Wiggins opened up his lead to 1' 20" over Rogers, with Evans moving into third – taking the points classification lead in the process – ahead of Froome. 's Andy Schleck, one of the favourites for July's Tour de France, abandoned during the stage  citing a knee injury from his time trial crash.

Stage 7
10 June 2012 — Morzine to Châtel, 

Mini-attacks set the course of the early running of the stage, with the field remaining as a whole for the first hour of racing after the attacks were closed down within minutes.

Coppel was the best-placed rider of the octet, as he was in fifteenth place overall overnight around four-and-a-half minutes down on race leader Bradley Wiggins; as such, the breakaway's advantage was not allowed to gather momentum and the gap remained between two and two-and-a-half minutes for the majority of the stage.  allowed  to carry out most of the work in the peloton, with Wiggins keeping an eye on their rider Cadel Evans, who had made a late-race attack the previous day and gained time back to Wiggins. Coppel, Westra and Rolland, the break initiators, then went clear again on the second-category Côte de la Vernaz, but the peloton were still closing in on them, after chasing down a group that had got clear on the climb. Vincenzo Nibali remained off the front, and tried to close down the leaders. Rolland and Coppel dropped Westra on the descent from the following Col du Corbier climb, where he was eventually joined by Nibali, but the solo move that he had put in was starting to show as he could not stay with Westra, and was eventually caught by the -led peloton with around  remaining.

Westra was caught not long after that as the lead duo's advantage was diminishing by the kilometre, as they held a half-minute lead into the final . Moreno and 's Luis León Sánchez battled it out for the stage honours, with Moreno edging out his compatriot for the victory. Wiggins crossed the line ten seconds behind the nine-man lead group, but was sufficient enough for a second consecutive Dauphiné title by 1' 17" over team-mate Michael Rogers. Evans later stated that he was beaten by "the better rider", but remained pleased with his performance of third place, a stage victory and the points classification title.

Classification leadership
In the 2012 Critérium du Dauphiné, four different jerseys were awarded. For the general classification, calculated by adding each cyclist's finishing times on each stage, the leader received a yellow jersey with a blue bar. This classification was considered the most important of the 2012 Critérium du Dauphiné, and the winner of the classification was considered the winner of the race.

Additionally, there was a points classification, which awarded a green jersey. In the points classification, cyclists got points for finishing highly in a stage. For the first three mass-start stages – stages 1, 2 and 3 – the win earned 25 points, second place earned 22 points, third 20, fourth 18, fifth 16, and one point fewer per place down to a single point for 20th. For the prologue, individual time trial and final three stages, the win earned 15 points, second place earned 12 points, third 10, fourth 8, fifth 6, and one point fewer per place down to a single point for 10th.

There was also a mountains classification, the leadership of which was marked by a red and white polka-dot jersey. In the mountains classification, points were won by reaching the top of a climb before other cyclists. Each climb was categorised as either hors, first, second, third, or fourth-category, with more points available for the higher-categorised climbs. Hors catégorie climbs awarded the most points, with 20 points on offer for the first rider across the summit; the first ten riders were able to accrue points towards the mountains classification, compared with the first eight on first-category passes and the first six riders on second-category climbs. Fewer points were on offer for the smaller hills, marked as third-category or fourth-category.

The fourth jersey represented the young rider classification, marked by a white jersey. This was decided the same way as the general classification, but only riders born after 1 January 1987 were eligible to be ranked in the classification. There was also a classification for teams, in which the times of the best three cyclists per team on each stage were added together; the leading team at the end of the race was the team with the lowest total time.

References

External links

2012
2012 UCI World Tour
2012 in French sport
June 2012 sports events in France